The Lady with the Veil, The Lady with the Fan, or The Veiled Lady is a 1768 oil-on-canvas portrait by Alexander Roslin of his wife Marie-Suzanne Giroust in Bolognese dress. The work was mentioned in an inventory from Österbybruk as Portrait of the One-Eyed Woman; it is now in the Nationalmuseum in Stockholm under its current title. It featured in the 1972 Swedish series of stamps Gustaviansk konst.

References

18th-century portraits
Portraits of women
1768 paintings
Paintings in the collection of the Nationalmuseum Stockholm
Paintings by Alexander Roslin